- born  in Tokyo in April 1979 - is a Japanese illustrator and animator. She is a graduate from the Tokyo Zokei University. The pen name "Obetomo" is her nickname from her college years. Her most famous work is the kids cartoon "Obetomo Gakuen", broadcast on the national NHK network since 2009.

References

External links
 Official website (japanese)

Living people
1979 births
People from Tokyo
Japanese illustrators
Japanese women illustrators
Japanese animators
Japanese television directors
Anime directors
Japanese animated film directors
Japanese women animators
Japanese women film directors
Women television directors